The  M. P. Birla Institute of Fundamental Research, is a natural and applied sciences research institute and society headquartered in Kolkata, West Bengal, India. Its director is astrophysicist Dr. G. S. D. Babu.

The institute is involved in research in conjunction with the Birla Planetarium, also located in Kolkata, which is one of the world's largest planetariums.

The institute has conducted courses in astrobiology for undergraduate students, in which certificates of completion are awarded after course completion.

Bangalore branch
The institute has a branch in Bangalore, India devoted to astronomy and astrophysics. The Bangalore location is recognized by Bangalore University as a research center to conduct research programs for Ph.D. degrees in physics specializing in astrophysics under Bangalore University's jurisdiction.

References

External links
 Official website Bangalore branch

Research institutes in Kolkata
Research institutes in Bangalore
Year of establishment missing